LeJeune's Bakery is a historic bakery located at 1510 Main Street in Jeanerette, Louisiana.

Opened in 1884 by Oscar J. LeJeune as the Old Reliable City Bakery, the building underwent a major remodelling in 1918, when O.A. LeJeune and Walter LeJeune, Sr. purchased the bakery from Oscar. The building was renamed LeJeune's some time between 1918 and 1934.

The building was added to the National Register of Historic Places on April 22, 2003.

The historic bakery is still selling its french bread, ginger cakes and garlic bread as of 2019.

See also
National Register of Historic Places listings in Iberia Parish, Louisiana

References

External links
 LeJeune's Bakery - official site

Jeanerette, Louisiana
Bakeries of the United States
Buildings and structures in Iberia Parish, Louisiana
Commercial buildings on the National Register of Historic Places in Louisiana
National Register of Historic Places in Iberia Parish, Louisiana